Mikhail Georgievich Khalansky (1 November 1857 — 29 March 1910) was Russian Slavonic philologist and folklorist and corresponding member of the academy of the Saint Petersburg Academy of Sciences since 5 December 1909.

External links 
 Short biographical data on the website of the Russian Academy of Sciences

1857 births
1910 deaths
National University of Kharkiv alumni
Corresponding members of the Saint Petersburg Academy of Sciences